Dr. Bronner's Magic Soaps is an American producer of organic soap and personal care products headquartered in Vista, California. The company was founded in the late 1940s by Emanuel Bronner and continues to be run by members of the Bronner family. The company's products are known for their text-heavy labels and the variety of their advertised uses for a single product (e.g. one soap advertises eighteen uses, from toothpaste and shampoo to toilet scrubber and insecticide). The company's 2017 annual revenue was $120 million.

History 
Dr. Bronner's Magic Soaps was founded by Emanuel Heilbronner, a Jewish immigrant soap-maker (not a physician) who fled Germany in 1928 and dropped the "Heil" from his name because of its associations with Adolf Hitler. His family who stayed behind were murdered in the Holocaust. After escaping from a mental institution in 1945, he went into business.

Bronner was a fervent promulgator of his own syncretic spiritual ideology and originally distributed the soap to those who attended lectures on his 'All One' philosophy, but soon became convinced that attendees were seeking soap rather than spiritual enlightenment. After this realization, Bronner began to print key tenets of his teachings on the soap bottles as a way to proselytize. The labels still include lengthy diatribes on the unity of mankind and the need to "unite spaceship earth". In 2006, an 88-minute documentary film directed by Sara Lamm, entitled Dr. Bronner's Magic Soapbox, was released, and in 2017 the company released a spoken word album of Emanuel Bronner's spiritual teachings.

For a period of time, Bronner ran the company as a tax-exempt religious organization but was found to be out of compliance with this designation and was levied with $1.3 million in back-taxes in 1985. When this occurred, Jim Bronner, Emanuel's son, began to work for the company and recapitalized it as a for-profit company in 1988.

In 1997, Jim Bronner's son David began working for the company. The soap had long included caramel coloring, but the company had never disclosed this ingredient. In 1999, as part of the company's rebranding as "social and natural," David Bronner faced a choice: declare the ingredient or omit it. Both would have had disadvantages. He decided to replace the caramel color with hemp oil, which not only added color but also added value by making the foam smoother. From then on, David Bronner also campaigned intensively for the legalization of hemp.

David Bronner's brother Michael began working for the company in 2000. Michael Bronner assumed presidency of the company in 2015 and promoted his brother David Bronner to the position of CEO (or Cosmic Engagement Officer).

Supply chain 
The major ingredients (mainly vegetable oils, lye, and essential oils) in Dr. Bronner's Magic Soaps products are organic and fair trade. The company has developed a number of fair trade and organic production systems in Ghana, Sri Lanka, Samoa, India, and Kenya through its sister LLC, Serendiworld.

Activism and philanthropy 
Dr. Bronner's Magic Soaps has championed a number of causes related to drug policy reform, animal rights, genetically modified organisms and fair trade practices. The company has self-imposed caps on executive pay, with executive salaries not to exceed five times the wage of its lowest paid workers. Roughly a third of the company's profits are dedicated to charitable giving and activist causes annually.

In 2018, the company joined Patagonia, Inc. and The Rodale Institute in promoting the development of the Regenerative Organic Certification label, a more stringent certification than 'organic' that requires companies to utilize only ingredients that have been produced under conditions that foster workers' rights, animal welfare, and environmental sustainability. In 2013 the company donated $1.8 million to the campaign to pass a proposition requiring the labeling of foods containing genetically modified organisms in Washington State.

In 2017, Dr. Bronner's Magic Soaps donated $600,000 to animal rights causes. Notably, the company purchased a boat for Sea Shepherd Conservation Society operations in Germany, the MV Emanuel Bronner. For the company's national and international experience in sustainable development, and eco-friendly products, the Environment Possibility Award conferred the "Award of Earth Defender" to Dr. Bronner's in 2020.

CEO David Bronner is a critic of drug prohibition and an activist for the legalization of a number of psychoactive substances. In 2004 the company sued the Drug Enforcement Administration with the goal of changing rules regarding the importation of hemp oil. A federal judge ruled in favor of the plaintiffs. David Bronner has been arrested twice for civil disobedience protesting limitations on the domestic production of hemp. In 2004 he planted hemp seeds on the lawn of the Drug Enforcement Administration headquarters, and in 2012, he harvested hemp while locked in a metal cage in front of the White House. In 2015 he was named Cannabis Activist of the Year by the Seattle Hempfest. 

Bronner is a member of the Board of Directors of the organization Multidisciplinary Association for Psychedelic Studies, and at his behest the company has pledged to donate $5 million to the organization between 2017 and 2022, principally for their work in support of the therapeutic use of MDMA for posttraumatic stress disorder. In 2019, David Bronner pledged company contributions of $1 million to Oregon's statewide ballot initiative to legalize psilocybin-assisted therapy, alongside nonprofits like SPORE and ERIE. By the time Oregon Ballot Measure 109 was approved by voters in November 2020, legalizing psilocybin in therapeutic settings, Dr. Bronner's had donated more than $2 million in support of the measure.

References

Companies based in San Diego County, California
Companies established in the 1940s
Personal care companies
1940s establishments in California
American cannabis activists
Soaps
B Lab-certified corporations